Lawrence Ikechukwu Ezemonye is a Nigerian Professor of Ecotoxicology and Environmental Forensics. He assumed office as the Vice Chancellor of Igbinedion University, Okada in 2018. Prior to being appointed a Vice Chancellor, Ezemonye served as the Deputy Vice-Chancellor (Administration) at the University of Benin, Benin City.

Background and early life 
Ezemonye is a fellow of the Nigerian Environmental Society (FNES) and the first director of the National Centre for Energy and Environment of the Energy Commission of Nigeria. Ezemonye is admitted as Fellow of Nigerian Academy of Science.

References 

Living people
Nigerian scientists
Vice-Chancellors of Nigerian universities
Nigerian academic administrators
Nigerian academics
Year of birth missing (living people)
Fellows of the Nigerian Academy of Science